The following television stations broadcast on digital  channel 36 in Mexico:

 XHA-TDT in Durango, Durango
 XHACC-TDT in Acapulco, Guerrero
 XHAOX-TDT in Oaxaca, Oaxaca 
 XHATJ-TDT in Atotonilco el Alto, Jalisco
 XHBE-TDT in Coatzacoalcos, Veracruz
 XHCAS-TDT in Caborca, Sonora 
 XHCAW-TDT in Ciudad Acuña, Coahuila
 XHCCH-TDT in Ciudad Cuauhtémoc, Chihuahua
 XHCCU-TDT in Cancún, Quintana Roo
 XHCDO-TDT in Ciudad Obregón, Sonora
 XHCHC-TDT in Ciudad Camargo, Chihuahua
 XHCJH-TDT in Ciudad Juárez, Chihuahua 
 XHCTUR-TDT in Uruapan, Michoacán
 XHCTVL-TDT in Villahermosa, Tabasco
 XHDY-TDT in San Cristóbal de Las Casas, Chiapas
 XHIV-TDT in Zacatecas, Zacatecas
 XHJU-TDT in Tapachula, Chiapas 
 XHKG-TDT in Tepic, Nayarit 
 XHMAP-TDT in Monclova, Coahuila
 XHMAW-TDT in Manzanillo, Colima
 XHPAT-TDT in Puerto Ángel, Oaxaca
 XHPBMY-TDT in Monterrey, Nuevo León
 XHPHG-TDT in Pachuca, Hidalgo 
 XHPVT-TDT in Puerto Vallarta, Jalisco 
 XHQUE-TDT in Querétaro, Querétaro
 XHREY-TDT in Reynosa, Tamaulipas
 XHSMT-TDT in San Miguel Tlacotepec, Oaxaca
 XHTM-TDT in Altzomoni, México
 XHTMGJ-TDT in León, Guanajuato
 XHTOK-TDT on Jocotitlán, State of Mexico
 XHTSCO-TDT in Saltillo, Coahuila
 XHUT-TDT in Ciudad Victoria, Tamaulipas 
 XHVSL-TDT in Ciudad Valles, San Luis Potosí 
 XHZIM-TDT in Zinapécuaro, Michoacán

36